Gian Ercole Salvi (1892 - 1972) was an Italian athlete and then a manager of the Virtus Pallacanestro Bologna.

Personal best
 400 metres: 51.2 (Milan, 20 September 1913)

National titles
He won five national championships at individual senior level.
 Italian Athletics Championships
 200 metres: 1919
 400 metres: 1913, 1919
 800 metres: 1913
 Contested javelin throw: 1914

References

External links
 
 Il mito della V nera - The history of Virtus Bologna 

1892 births
Date of death unknown
Italian male sprinters
Italian male middle-distance runners
Italian male javelin throwers
Italian Athletics Championships winners